James Frederick Grenville Lance (born 29 September 1974) is an English actor, best known for his appearances in a number of British comedy series and the British-American comedy series Ted Lasso for which he was nominated for a Primetime Emmy Award for Outstanding Guest Actor in a Comedy Series in 2022.

Early life
Lance was born in Southampton and grew up in Westbury-sub-Mendip, Somerset, he attended the Sylvia Young Theatre School.

Career
Lance's appearances in comedy series include Top Buzzer, I'm Alan Partridge, Absolute Power, Spaced, Absolutely Fabulous, Smack the Pony, The Book Group, 2point4 Children, Rescue Me, Doc Martin, People Like Us, No Heroics, Toast of London, Saxondale and, most recently, as the recurring character Trent Crimm, a sportswriter at The Independent, on the Apple TV+ series Ted Lasso.

Drama appearances have included Teachers, Boy Meets Girl, The Impressionists, Sensitive Skin, Marple, Being Human, Midsomer Murders, Moving Wallpaper and Black Mirror.

Lance has also appeared in the films Late Night Shopping, The Search for John Gissing, Marie Antoinette, Bronson and Bel Ami.

Lance voiced several UK TV commercials for brands such as Maybelline, Wrigley's Extra, the AA. and Moneysupermarket.com.

Lance appeared on stage as Miles at the Trafalgar Studios in May 2009 in Marcus Markou's play Ordinary Dreams; Or How to Survive a Meltdown with Flair. He portrayed Eric Idle at the 2009 Edinburgh Festival in a play called Pythonesque by writer Roy Smiles.

Personal life
In 2016, Lance married Kate Quilton. The couple have a son, born in 2018.

References

External links
 

Living people
1974 births
20th-century English male actors
21st-century English male actors
Alumni of the Sylvia Young Theatre School
English male film actors
English male stage actors
English male television actors
Male actors from Somerset
Male actors from Southampton
People from Mendip District